Marco Milesi (born 30 January 1970) is a former Italian racing cyclist, who rode professionally between 1994 and 2006. Before that, he finished in second place in the Girobio in 1993. He started six times in a grand Tour (three times in the Tour de France, two times in the Giro d'Italia and once in the Vuelta a España), but did not achieve notable successes. His best result in a classic race was the 10th place in 1996 Paris–Roubaix.

External links 

1970 births
Living people
Italian male cyclists
Cyclists from the Province of Bergamo